The Independent Municipal & Allied Trade Union (IMATU) is a trade union in South Africa. It has a membership of 105,000 and is the largest politically independent trade union in the local government sector.

The Union was founded in 8 March 1996, with the merger of five unions:
 Durban Municipal Employees' Association
 Johannesburg Municipal Employees' Association
 National Union of Employees of Local Authorities
 South African Association of Municipal Employees
 South African Local Authorities and Allied Workers' Union

It originally affiliated to the Federation of South African Labour Unions, then to its successor, the Federation of Unions of South Africa, but it is now independent.

External links

References

Federation of Unions of South Africa
International Trade Union Confederation
Municipal workers' trade unions
Trade unions established in 1996
Trade unions in South Africa